Gilbert Bayiha-N'Djema (born 9 August 1979) is a Cameroonian former footballer. He is currently the head coach of CS Longueuil's reserve team.

Personal 
N'Djema holds French passport.

References

External links
 
 
 

1979 births
Living people
Association football goalkeepers
Cameroonian footballers
French footballers
Footballers from Essonne
People from Les Ulis
French sportspeople of Cameroonian descent
Cameroonian expatriate footballers
Expatriate footballers in Cyprus
Expatriate soccer players in Canada
Cameroonian expatriate sportspeople in Canada
Ligue 2 players
CS Sedan Ardennes players
Grenoble Foot 38 players
Aris Limassol FC players
PAEEK players
Cypriot First Division players
Cypriot Second Division players
Première ligue de soccer du Québec players
Cameroon under-20 international footballers